Scha may refer to:

People
 Remko Scha (1945–2015), Dutch professor of computational linguistics
 Scha Alyahya (born 1983), Malaysian model, actress and TV host

Other
 Shcha (Щ), a Cyrillic letter
 Chamonate Airport (ICAO: SCHA), an airport serving Copiapó, Atacama Region, Chile

See also
 Sha (disambiguation)
 Shah (disambiguation)